Ceroplesis molator is a species of beetle in the family Cerambycidae. It was described by Johan Christian Fabricius in 1787. It is known from Ghana, Cameroon, Sierra Leone, Togo, and Senegal. It feeds on Coffea canephora (robusta coffee).

References

molator
Beetles described in 1787